Holmertz is a surname. Notable people with the surname include:

Anders Holmertz (born 1968), Swedish swimmer
Mikael Holmertz (born 1965), Swedish swimmer, brother of Anders
Per Holmertz (born 1960), Swedish swimmer